The Milwaukee Art Museum (MAM) is an art museum in Milwaukee, Wisconsin. Its collection contains nearly 25,000 works of art.

Location and Visit 
Located on the lakefront of Lake Michigan, the Milwaukee Art Museum is one of the largest art museums in the United States. Aside from its galleries, the museum includes a cafe, named Cafe Calatrava, with views of Lake Michigan and a gift shop.

Hours 
Normal operating hours for MAM are Tues-Wed and Fri-Sun 10am to 5pm, Thurs 10am to 8pm.

History

Origins

Beginning around 1872, multiple organizations were founded in order to bring an art gallery to Milwaukee, as the city was still a growing port town with little or no facilities to hold major art exhibitions. Over the span of at least nine years, all attempts to build a major art gallery had failed. Shortly after that year, Alexander Mitchell donated all of his collection to constructing Milwaukee's first permanent art gallery in the city's history.

In 1888, the Milwaukee Art Association was created by a group of German panorama artists and local businessmen. The same year, British-born businessman Frederick Layton built, endowed and provided artwork for the Layton Art Gallery, now demolished. In 1911, the Milwaukee Art Institute, another building constructed to hold other exhibitions and collections, was completed, adjacent to the Layton Art Gallery.

The Milwaukee Art Museum was founded in 1888 and is purported to be Milwaukee's first art gallery. That claim is disputed by the Layton Art Gallery, which opened the same year.

The Milwaukee Art Center, now the Milwaukee Art Museum, was formed when the Milwaukee Art Institute and Layton Art Gallery merged their collections in 1957 and moved into the newly built Eero Saarinen-designed Milwaukee County War Memorial.

Architecture

Quadracci 
The Milwaukee art museum is a multi-purpose 142,050-square-foot building with areas that include a reception hall, auditorium, exhibition space, and stores. It was design by the Spanish Architect Santiago Calatrava who was inspired by Frank Lloyd Wright's works. The construction methods of concrete slabs into timber frames was revolutionary in architecture and was completed in 2001. Windover Hall is a 90 foot tall grand reception area topped with a glass roof. The style and symbolism of the building is based on gothic architecture and designed to represent the shape of a ship looking over Lake Michigan. Santiago states, “the building’s form is at once formal (completing the composition), functional (controlling the level of light), symbolic (opening to welcome visitors), and iconic (creating a memorable image for the Museum and the city).”

Kahler and Calatrava Buildings
In the latter half of the 20th century, the museum came to include the War Memorial Center in 1957 as well as the brutalist Kahler Building (1975) designed by David Kahler and the Quadracci Pavilion (2001) created by Spanish architect Santiago Calatrava. 

The Quadracci Pavilion contains a movable, wing-like brise soleil that opens up for a wingspan of  during the day, folding over the tall, arched structure at night or during inclement weather. There are sensors on the wings that monitor wind speeds, so if the wind speeds are over 23 mph for over 3 seconds, the wings close. The pavilion received the 2004 Outstanding Structure Award from the International Association for Bridge and Structural Engineering. This iconic building, often referred to as "the Calatrava", is used in the museum logo.

2015 Shields Building
In November 2015, the museum opened a $34 million expansion funded jointly by a museum capital campaign and by Milwaukee County. The new building that is called the Shields Building, and is designed by Milwaukee architect James Shields of HGA, provides an additional 30,000 square feet for art, including a section devoted to light-based media, photography, and video installation. The building includes a new atrium and lakefront-facing entry point for visitors and was designed with cantilevered elements and concrete columns to complement, respectively, the existing Calatrava and Kahler structures on the site. The final design emerged after a lengthy process that included the main architect's departure because of design disputes and his return to the project.

Cudahy Gardens 
The Quadracci Pavilion was design in conjunction to the Quadracci Pavilion by landscape architect Dan Kiley. This garden is rectangular shaped that measures 600 feet by 100 feet that is divided into five lawns by a series of 10-foot-tall hedge lines. In this garden there is a center fountain that creates a 4-foot-tall water curtain. There are linden trees and crabapple trees scattered throughout this garden as well. The gardens were named after philanthropist Michael Cudahy whose donations greatly contributed to the construction of these gardens.

Collection 
The museum houses nearly 25,000 works of art housed on four floors, with works from antiquity to the present. Included in the collection are 15th- to 20th-century European and 17th- to 20th-century American paintings, sculpture, prints, drawings, decorative arts, photographs, and folk and self-taught art. Among the best in the collection are the museum's holding of American decorative arts, German Expressionism, folk and Haitian art, and American art after 1960.

The museum holds one of the largest collections of works by Wisconsin native Georgia O'Keeffe. Other artists represented include Gustave Caillebotte, Nardo di Cione, Francisco de Zurbarán, Jean-Honoré Fragonard, Winslow Homer, Auguste Rodin, Edgar Degas, Claude Monet, Gabriele Münter, Henri de Toulouse-Lautrec, Frank Lloyd Wright, Pablo Picasso, Joan Miró, Wassily Kandinsky, Mark Rothko, Robert Gober, and Andy Warhol.

It also has paintings by European painters Francesco Botticini, Jan Swart van Groningen, Ferdinand Bol, Jan van Goyen, Hendrick Van Vliet, Franz von Lenbach (Bavarian Girl), Ferdinand Waldmüller (Interruption), Carl Spitzweg, William-Adolphe Bouguereau, Jean-Léon Gérôme (2 Majesties), Gustave Caillebotte, Camille Pissarro, Alfred Kowalski (Winter in Russia), Jules Bastien-Lepage (The Wood Gatherer), and Max Pechstein.

Gallery

Governance

Management 
Directors
 1977-1985 Gerald Nordland
 1985-2002 Russell Bowman
 2002-2008 David Gordon - director and CEO
 2008-2016 Daniel Keegan
 2016 Marcelle Polednik - Donna and Donald Baumgartner Director

Funding 
As of 2015, the museum’s endowment is around $65 million. Endowment proceeds cover a fraction of the museum's expenses, leaving it overly dependent on funds from day-to-day operations such as ticket sales. Daniel Keegan, who has served as the museum's director since 2008, negotiated an agreement with Milwaukee County and the Milwaukee County War Memorial for the long-term management and funding of the facilities in 2013.

Controversy
In June 2015 the museum's display of a work depicting Benedict XVI, composed of 17,000 latex condoms, created outrage among Catholics and others.

In Popular Culture 
The Quadracci Pavilion has an appearance in the 2008 EA racing video game, Need for Speed: Undercover.

See also
 Argo, a sculpture on the grounds
 The Calling, a sculpture in the Museum's collection on adjacent O'Donnell Park

References

External links
 Official website
Milwaukee Art Museum within Google Arts & Culture

 

1882 establishments in Wisconsin
Art museums established in 1882
Art museums and galleries in Wisconsin
Buildings and structures completed in 2001
High-tech architecture
Modernist architecture in Wisconsin
Museums in Milwaukee
Neo-futurism architecture
Santiago Calatrava structures
Tourist attractions in Milwaukee